Masud Rana is a Bangladeshi crime action film released in 1974. Masud Rana is a fictional character created by Qazi Anwar Hussain and published under the banner of Sheba Prokashoni. Since 1966, it has published over four hundred books on this character. It was based on the story of Bismoron (lit. Amnesia) novel of Masud Rana series, which in turn is based on Strictly for Cash.. by James Hadley Chase. This is the debut film of Sohel Rana.

The film stars Sohel Rana in the role of Masud Rana, Olivia and Kabori, Golam Mostafa, Khalil, Fateh Lohani and Razzak as a guest actor.

Plot
Masud Rana, who was visiting Sri Lanka, suddenly got into trouble. While fleeing with helper Rita and her husband Kumar, they met with a road accident. He lost his memory in the accident. Rita, a newly widowed woman, conspired with Rana to illegally occupy her husband's property.

Cast
 Sohel Rana - Masud Rana
 Kabori - Sabita
 Olivia - Rita
 Golam Mustafa - Hulugal
 Khalil - Natraj Hikka
 Fateh Lohani - Raghunath
 Saifuddin - Police officer
 Razzak - club singer (as guest actor)
 Khan Zainul - Pillai of Tirugansampandamutinina
 Sultana - Office Secretary
 Jabed Rohim
 Juber
 Bibek
 Gui
 Babul
 Robiul - Hospital janitor
 Jasim
 Noalin
 Jhuma Mukherjee

Production

Development
In 1973, the plan to making a film based on Masud Rana novel was made by Sohel Rana. For that purpose, an advertisement was published in newspaper for main character of the film. A character election committee was made. Members of the committee were Ahmed Zaman Chowdhury S.M Shafi, Sumita Devi and producer Sohel Rana. After some days Ahmed Zaman Chowdhury of the committee, who was film journalist of that time suggested that Sohel Rana should be Masud Rana of the film. In that time he acted as actor, producer and director of the film.

Filming
The story set in Bangladesh and Sri Lanka. Most of the scenes of the film are shot in Cox’s Bazar, especially for Sri Lankan parts. Remaining scenes of the film are shot in TSC, DU and Bangladesh Atomic Energy Commission, Dhaka.

Music

Azad Rahman has directed and composed the music for Masud Rana. Sabina Yasmin, Anjuman Ara Begum, Khurshid Alam and Selina Azad sang the songs of the film.

Awards

References

External links

1974 films
Masud Rana
1970s action thriller films
Bengali-language Bangladeshi films
1970s Bengali-language films
Bangladeshi action thriller films
Bangladeshi black-and-white films
Films scored by Azad Rahman
Films based on Bengali novels
Films based on Bangladeshi novels
Films shot in Cox's Bazar
Films shot in Dhaka
Films set in Sri Lanka
Parvez Films films